NFAA may refer to:

 National Field Archery Association
 National Foundation for Advancement in the Arts
 No Fun at All, a Swedish skate punk rock music band